Plasmodium neusticuri is a parasite of the genus Plasmodium.

Like all Plasmodium species P. neusticuri has both vertebrate and insect hosts. The vertebrate hosts for this parasite are reptiles.

Description 

This species infects the lizard Neusticurus bicarinatus.

Blood stages of the parasite are described to occupy at one pole of the host cell. Infection does not enlarge or distort the host red blood cells. Each infected cell generally yields 4 to 8 new merozoites. Gametocytes are "kidney-shaped" and are smaller than the host cell nucleus.

Geographical occurrence 

This species is found in Brazil in the Amazon area.

Hosts
P. neusticuri has only been described from the blood of N. bicarinatus. It is not clear if P. neusticuri causes disease symptoms in this host.

References 

neusticuri